Jes Wilhelm Schlaikjer (1897–1982) was an American artist, most known for his recruitment and war bonds posters during World War II.

Early life
Schlaikjer was born during a storm at sea on the maiden voyage of the SS Kaiser Wilhelm der Grosse. His parents, Erich Hansen Schlaikjer and Clara Ryser, were emigrating from Germany to New York. Supposedly they, at first, named their son, Wilhelm Parker Schlaikjer, after the ship and the ship's American pilot, William Parker.

His father was a successful salesman of drug remedies. Erich and Clara were married in Germany in 1896.

The Schlaikjer family lived in Ohio and Johnstown City, Kentucky before settling down on a farm in Carter township, Tripp County, South Dakota in 1907. Jes Wilhelm was the firstborn of five children: Arthur, Oscar, Hugo, and Erich.

From an early age, Schlaikjer enjoyed drawing and was known for his talent in school. At first, he enjoyed painting the horses he saw roaming the plains. His cartoons were featured in a local newspaper in Carter, South Dakota when he was 13 years old. Later in his teen years, Schlaikjer worked for a Chicago newspaper as an artist and cartoonist.

In 1916, he graduated from Winner High School.

Military and education
After graduating from high school, Schlaikjer enlisted in the Army. During World War I, he served in the Signal Corps of the Army 1st Division in France as a telegrapher. After some time he "rose in rank" to Chief Receiving Operator at the Layfayette Radio Station in Paris. This was the "main continental communication link for the Allied forces."

When the war was over, Schlaikjer decided to stay in France. He studied at the École des Beaux Arts in Lyons.

On June 3, 1920, he returned to his parents' farm in South Dakota. During this time he worked as a telegrapher for the Chicago, Burlington, and Quincey railroad line. In September, Schlaikjer moved to Chicago and studied at the School of the Art Institute. Here, he met illustrator Dean Cornwell and painter Harvey Dunn. Schlaikjer studied under Robert Henri.

Art career
Schlaikjer's illustrations appeared in various magazines, including Scribner's, Collier's, American Legion Monthly, Redbook, Woman's Home Companion, and Cosmopolitan.

He often painted covers for pulp magazines such as Black Mask, Adventure, Everybody's Magazine, Frontier Stories, and West. Schlaikjer's signature on these covers were always scribbled in a splat that contained his initials and the date. This may have been an intentional cover-up to disguise his work without "jeopardizing" his career with the more "slick" magazines.

In 1926, Schlaikjer earned the first Hallgarten prize at the National Academy of Design Annual Exhibition. He received this award for a portrait of his wife titled "The Pink Cameo."

On November 21, 1928, he won the $1000 first prize from the National Academy of Design. This same year he was the winner of the first Altman prize for the best figure painting by an American-born citizen for South Dakota Evening.

In 1932, Schlaikjer was again awarded the Hallgarten prize for his painting titled "The Little Ones."

In October 1930, Schlaikjer opened an art studio near the Art Students League.

In 1932, he began teaching at the National Academy of Design. He was also made an honorary member of the school.

Along with other conservative artists, Cromwell and Schlaikjer founded the Advance American Art Commission. This was done in response to the controversy surrounding Diego Rivera's mural at Rockefeller Center. Their purpose was to cope with the "existing foreign evils and abuses threatening American Art."

In 1942, he was chosen as the War Department artist during World War II. Schlaikjer painted posters for recruitment, war bonds, the Red Cross, the infantry, Signal Corps, Military Police, Army Air Force, Marines, Navy, and Women's Army Corps.  He was also the portraitist for military leaders, including Dwight D. Eisenhower, Douglas MacArthur, and George S. Patton. At the time, he had a studio in The Pentagon. These portraits now hang in the War College in Washington in Washington D.C.

After the war, Schlaikjer set up a portrait studio in Washington D.C.

In 1947, he taught at the Newark School of Fine and Industrial Arts.

In 1948, Schlaikjer's membership in the National Academy of Design was elevated from associate member to full membership.

Schlaikjer had work exhibited at the Pennsylvania Academy of Fine Arts in Philadelphia and the Corcoran Gallery of Art in Washington D.C.

His historical portrait of Abraham Lincoln working on the Emancipation Proclamation remains one of the few paintings depicting Lincoln managing this task at the Soldier's Home.

He was a member of the National Academy of Design, the Grand Central Art Gallery, the Artists Guild, the American Legion, the Armor and Arms Club, the First Division Society, and the Salamagundi Club.

Personal life
Schlaikjer met his wife, Gladys de Groot, while studying at the Art Institute. They married on September 14, 1922, and moved to New York City soon after. They lived in the Bronx as well. The couple had two children: Jes Erich (born in 1924) and Helen Jean (born in 1926). His son became an electronic engineer and engineering writer, and his daughter was an artist.

Schlaikjer began blacksmithing in the early 1930s. He first learned how to make horseshoes, and it turned into a hobby. He forged iron and made medieval armor, swords, shields, cutlery, and guns. During this time, the tools to make armor could not be bought, so Schlaikjer had to make all of his own tools.

On August 21, 1982, Schlaikjer died of Parkinson's disease at the age of 84.

Legacy
Schlaikjer has had permanent exhibitions in the following places: 
 National Academy of Design
 Ranger Collection
 United States Naval Academy in Annapolis, Maryland
 United States Department of War
 American Red Cross National Headquarters
 Walter Reed Army Medical Center in Washington D.C.
 United States Department of State in Washington D.C.
 Nelson Gallery, Kansas City, Missouri
 University of Indiana
 Marine Corps School of Quantico, Virginia
 Federal Reserve Bank of Kansas City

References

External links
Jes Wilhelm Schlaikjer Digital Archives at Pritzker Military Museum and Library
Jes Wilhelm Schlaikjer collection at Artnet.com

1897 births
1982 deaths
School of the Art Institute of Chicago alumni
United States Army soldiers
United States Army personnel of World War I